The year 1714 in science and technology involved some significant events.

Mathematics
 March – Roger Cotes publishes Logometrica in the Philosophical Transactions of the Royal Society. He provides the first proof of what is now known as Euler's formula and constructs the logarithmic spiral.
 May – Brook Taylor publishes a paper, written in 1708, in the Philosophical Transactions of the Royal Society which describes his solution to the center of oscillation problem.
 Gottfried Leibniz discusses the harmonic triangle.

Medicine
 April 14 – Anne, Queen of Great Britain, performs the last touching for the "King's evil".
 Dominique Anel uses the first fine-pointed syringe in surgery, later known as "Anel's syringe".
 Herman Boerhaave introduces a modern system of clinical teaching at the University of Leiden.
 The anatomical engravings of Bartolomeo Eustachi (died 1574) are published for the first time as Tabulae anatomicae by Giovanni Maria Lancisi.

Technology
 Henry Mill obtains a British patent for a machine resembling a typewriter.

Events
 July – The Parliament of Great Britain offers the Longitude prize to anyone who can solve the problem of accurately determining a ship's longitude.

Births
 January 21 – Anna Morandi, Bolognese anatomist (died 1774)
 January 6 – Percivall Pott, English surgeon (died 1788)
 June 17 – César-François Cassini de Thury, French astronomer (died 1784)
 September 6 – Robert Whytt, Scottish physician (died 1766)
 October 16 – Giovanni Arduino, Italian geologist (died 1795)
 October 25 – James Burnett, Lord Monboddo, Scottish philosopher and evolutionary thinker (died 1799)
 December 19 – John Winthrop, American astronomer (died 1779)
 December 31 – Arima Yoriyuki, Japanese mathematician (died 1783)
 Alexander Wilson, Scottish surgeon, type founder, astronomer, meteorologist and mathematician (died 1786)

Deaths
 October 5 – Kaibara Ekiken, Japanese philosopher and botanist (born 1630)
 November 1 – John Radcliffe, English physician and benefactor (born 1652)
 November 5 – Bernardino Ramazzini, Italian physician (born 1633)

References

 
18th century in science
1710s in science